Édouard Charles Octave Mignan (17 March 1884 - 17 September 1969) was a French organist and composer.

He was born in Orléans and 14 years old he became the organist of  église Saint Paterne. He studied organ in Paris with Alexandre Guilmant and Louis Vierne and won the Grand Prix de Rome in 1912. He was organist at Saint-Thomas-d'Aquin from 1917 to 1935. He succeeded Henri Dallier as organist of la Madeleine in 1935 and held that post until 1962.

He died in Paris at the age of 85.

References

1884 births
1969 deaths
Musicians from Orléans
French classical organists
French male organists
Prix de Rome for composition
20th-century French male musicians
Male classical organists